Pakistan Navy Cadet College Ormara, commonly known as Cadet College Ormara, is a military boarding school in Gwadar District of the southern province of Balochistan in Pakistan; about 360 km from Karachi and 230 km from Gwadar which is under administration of Pakistan Navy.

History
The college was founded in 2013 by Pakistan Navy.

In 2017, academic block of the college was established.

References

Pakistan Navy
Cadet colleges in Pakistan
Universities and colleges in Balochistan, Pakistan
Gwadar District
Ormara
2013 establishments in Pakistan